The 2010 season was Universitario de Deportes' 82nd season in the Peruvian Primera División and 45th in the Torneo Descentralizado. This article shows player statistics and all matches (official and friendly) that the club played during the 2010 season.

Squad information

Competitions

Torneo Descentralizado

Universitario participates in the Torneo Descentralizado, Peru's highest division.

First stage
The first stage of the Torneo Descentralizado consisted of 16 teams where Universitario played 30 matches; one home game and one away game against each team. The winner of the first stage was eligible to play in first stage of the 2011 Copa Libertadores.

Standings

Summary

Results by round

Matches

Second stage
Universitario finished 5th and played against the teams that placed an odd number at the end of the First stage. The Second stage consisted of 14 matches (7 home and 7 away games) for Universitario. The winner of the group qualified to the 2011 Copa Libertadores.

Standings

Summary

Results by round

Matches

Copa Libertadores

Universitario qualified to the 2010 Copa Libertadores as 2009 season champion. They were drawn into Group 4 with Libertad, which they faced last Copa Libertadores, Lanús, and Clausura champion Blooming. They finished second and advanced to the Round of 16 as the 5th best second-placed team.

Group 4

Round of 16
In the Round of 16, Universitario faced three-time champion São Paulo.

Goalscorers

External links
Universitario.pe Official website

2010
Universitario de Deportes